Micronations, sometimes also referred to as model countries and new country projects, are small, self-proclaimed entities that claim to be independent sovereign states but which are not acknowledged as such by any recognised sovereign state, or by any supranational organization. They should not be confused with microstates, which are recognised independent states of a small size, nor should they be confused with unrecognised states, which are of more geopolitical significance because they exercise clear control of actual territory to the exclusion of widely recognized countries.

Motivations for the creation of micronations include theoretical experimentation, political protest, artistic expression, personal entertainment and the conduct of criminal activity.

The following is a list of notable micronations.

Current

Former

Australia

Austria

Bahamas

Brazil

Canada

Czech Republic

Germany

Indonesia

Italy

Jamaica

Nigeria

Spratly Islands

Tanganyika

Tonga

United Kingdom

United States

See also
 Flags of micronations
 How to Start Your Own Country
 Micronations: The Lonely Planet Guide to Home-Made Nations

References

Informational notes

Citations 

Politics-related lists